Barcs is a district in southern part of Somogy County. Barcs is also the name of the town where the district seat is found. The district is located in the Southern Transdanubia Statistical Region.

Geography 
Barcs District borders with Csurgó District, Nagyatád District and Kaposvár District to the north, Szigetvár District and Sellye District (Baranya County) to the east, the Croatian counties of Virovitica-Podravina and Koprivnica-Križevci to the southwest. The number of the inhabited places in Barcs District is 26.

Municipalities 
The district has 1 town and 25 villages.
(ordered by population, as of 1 January 2013)

The bolded municipality is city.

See also
List of cities and towns in Hungary

References

External links
 Postal codes of the Barcs District

Districts in Somogy County